Marie Samuelsson (born 15 February 1956) is a Swedish composer.

Biography
Marie Samuelsson was born in Stockholm, Sweden. She studied piano and improvisation at Birkagården College from 1979–81, musicology at the University of Stockholm from 1982–83 and composition at the Royal College of Music in Stockholm from 1987-95 with Sven-David Sandström, Daniel Börtz and Pär Lindgren. 

She later continued her studies with George Benjamin and 2001 she complemented her studies with Stage d’été for professional composers at Ircam in Paris.

Samuelsson is a member of the Royal Swedish Music Academy since 2005. In December 2012, she was elected to vice preses in the presidium of the Royal Swedish Music Academy. Samuelsson was the featured composer of a four-day festival in Stockholm in May 2007 for which her orchestra piece Singla was commissioned and premièred by the Royal Stockholm Philharmonic Orchestra.

In 2011, she was awarded The Composer Prize in the Memory of Bo Wallner.

Works
Selected works include:
Andra platser (Other places), for alto voice, cello, and percussion, 1989
Katt: Nio liv (Cat: Nine lives), for woodwind quintet, 1989
Från Indien till Mars (From India to Mars), dance music for string quartet with guitar improvisation, 1990–91
Den natten (That night), for choir, 1991
Signal for saxophone quartet, 1991
Lufttrumma I (Air shaft I), for alto saxophone, piano, and percussion, 1993
Troll for youth orchestra, 1993
Krom (Chrome), for brass quintet, 1994
Lufttrumma II (Air shaft II), for flute, clarinet, percussion, harp, and double bass, 1994
Magica de Hex (Magica de Spell), for orchestra, 1994
Pingvinkvartett (Penguin quartet), for flute, violin, cello, and piano, 1996
Sirén, for saxophone quartet, 1996
I vargens öga (In the eye of the wolf), for solo saxophone and tape, 1997
Rotationer (Rotations), for string orchestra, 1997 (revised, 2003)
Lufttrumma III (Air shaft III), for orchestra, 1999
Flow for chamber orchestra, 2000
I Am-Are You?, for French horn and tape, 2001
Ö (Island), for solo violin, 2002
Bastet the sun goddess, concerto for violin and orchestra, 2004
Paths of sorrow, for chamber orchestra, 2005
Skuggspel (Shadow play), for oboe and percussion, 2005
Eleven hundred and twelve degrees, for cello and tape, 2006
Fear and Hope, for orchestra, 2006
Singla, for orchestra, 2007
Komposition-Improvisation (Composition-Improvisation), for 2 saxophones, 2007
Sjörök under Stockholms broar (Sea smoke under Stockholms bridges), for string quartet, 2008
The Horn in the wind, concerto for horn and orchestra, 2009
Airborne Lines and Rumbles, for orchestra, 2009
Fanfar till livet, for brass section, 2010
Alive, for violin, 2010
Fantasia i cirkel, quartet  2011
Somebody is learning how to fly, for clarinet solo, 2011
Jorun orm i öga, opera libretto: Kerstin Ekman, for The Academy of Vadstena, premiere summer 2013 (work in progress)

Her works have been recorded and issued on CD, including:
The Love Trilogy (2019) Daphne 1062
Air Drum (2003) Phono Suecia
Rydberg, Enström, Samuelsson, Parmerud, Lindwall, and Feiler, (includes Signal) (1997) Caprice

References

External links
Official website

1956 births
20th-century classical composers
21st-century classical composers
Living people
Swedish classical composers
Women classical composers
Swedish women composers
20th-century women composers
21st-century women composers
20th-century Swedish women